Count Gábor (Gabriel) Esterházy de Galántha (15 April 1673 – 13 December 1704) was a Hungarian imperial general and noble, son of Paul I, Prince Esterházy and Orsolya Esterházy.

Career
He studied in Vienna and became imperial knight in 1690. He also functioned as a royal chamberlain and councillor. Count Esterházy served as ispán of Fejér County between 1688 and 16 September 1691. After that he was appointed ispán of Somogy and Zala Counties. He resigned from his preceding position on 29 March 1713. He became imperial general in 1701 and functioned as the commander of the Hungarian cavalry regiment. He died of smallpox in 1704.

Family

Count Gábor Esterházy married Countess Margaretha Christina von Abensberg und Traun (1677–1725) on 24 May 1694 in Vienna. They had six children:

 József (6 April 1695 – 1697), died young
 Mária Anna (b. 1698), died young
 Mihály (1701 – 4 January 1702), died young
 Mária Józsefa (b. 1701), died young
 Margit (d. 1732)
 Mária Franziska (29 November 1702 – 31 January 1778), married Altgrave Karl Anton zu Salm-Reifferscheidt-Bedburg und Alfter (1697–1755)

Works
 Hungaria Triumphans sive S. Ladislaus Rex Hungariae… in Basilica D. Stephani Nomine Inclytae Nation. Hung. panegyris laudat. Viennae, 1689. 27. Junii.

References

Sources
  Fallenbüchl, Zoltán (1994). Magyarország főispánjai, 1526–1848 ("Lord-Lieutenants of Counties in Hungary, 1526–1848"). Argumentum Kiadó.  .
  Szinnyei, József: Magyar írók élete és munkái II. (Caban–Exner). Budapest, Hornyánszky, 1893. (Online)

1673 births
1704 deaths
Gabor
Cavalry commanders
Austrian generals
Hungarian soldiers
Deaths from smallpox
17th-century philanthropists